Jaagruti is a 1992 Indian Hindi-language action drama film directed by Suresh Krissna, released on 3 June 1992. The film stars Salman Khan and Karisma Kapoor. The movie was produced by stunt director Raam Shetty under the name of S. R. Shetty.

Plot
Vishal (Pankaj Dheer) is a respectable and honest officer. One day Vishal is abducted and killed in the presence of his younger brother, Jugnu (Salman Khan), who is missing and considered to be dead. In reality, he is taken in by a jungle tribe, where the chief (Puneet Issar) trains him. Honest and diligent Gandhian Raghunath gets very angry by seeing this situation, and demands from the Chief Minister, Omiji, to step into the picture. When Omiji attempts to inquire into this, his son is incriminated for selling tainted glucose in hospitals, which caused several deaths. Powerless to act, Omiji hesitates, and as a result, Raghunath is killed. Thereafter, Jugnu returns, now a one-man army, willing to avenge his brother's death.

Cast
Salman Khan as Jugnu
Karisma Kapoor as Shalu
Ashok Saraf as Shevalal
Prem Chopra as Sunderlal
Aparajita as Widow
Beena as Jyoti
Suresh Bhagwat as Driver
Pankaj Dheer as Vishal
Mohan Joshi as Omiji
Puneet Issar as Leader of Tribal Group
Satyajeet as Adivasi (Tribal Man)

Music 

The soundtrack of the film contains 10 songs. The music is composed by Anand–Milind, with lyrics authored by Sameer.

References

External links

1992 films
1990s Hindi-language films
Films scored by Anand–Milind
Films directed by Suresh Krissna
1990s action drama films
1990s thriller drama films
Indian action drama films
Indian thriller drama films
Indian films about revenge